Andrew Timlin (born 15 June 1974) is a retired field hockey player from New Zealand, who was a regular member of the men's national team, nicknamed "The Black Sticks", during the 1990s. Timlin earned a total number of 43 caps during his career. He was part of the New Zealand squad which played at the 1998 World Cup.

References

External links
NZ commonwealthgames
NZ caps

1974 births
Living people
New Zealand male field hockey players
Field hockey players at the 1998 Commonwealth Games
1998 Men's Hockey World Cup players
Commonwealth Games competitors for New Zealand